Purple amaranth is a common name for several plants in the genus Amaranthus and may refer to:

Amaranthus blitum
Amaranthus cruentus